The 2014 European Parliament election was the United Kingdom's component of the 2014 European Parliament election, held on Thursday 22 May 2014, coinciding with the 2014 local elections in England and Northern Ireland. In total, 73 Members of the European Parliament were elected from the United Kingdom using proportional representation. England, Scotland and Wales use a closed-list party list system of PR (with the D'Hondt method), while Northern Ireland used the single transferable vote (STV).

Most of the election results were announced after 10pm on Sunday 25 May – with the exception of Scotland, which did not declare its results until the following day – after voting closed throughout the 28 member states of the European Union.

The most successful party overall was the UK Independence Party (UKIP) which won 24 seats and 27% of the popular vote, the first time a political party other than the Labour Party or Conservative Party had won the popular vote at a British election since the 1906 general election. It was also the first time a party other than Labour or Conservative had won the largest number of seats in a national election since the December 1910 general election. In addition, the 23.1% of the vote won by the Conservatives was the lowest recorded voteshare for the party in a national election until 2019.

The Labour Party became the first Official Opposition party since 1984 to fail to win a European Parliament election, although it did gain 7 seats, taking its overall tally to 20. The governing Conservative Party was pushed into third place for the first time at any European Parliament election, falling to 19 seats, while the Green Party of England and Wales saw its number of MEPs increase for the first time since 1999, winning 3 seats. In Scotland, the Scottish National Party won the largest share of the vote, taking 29% of the vote and 2 MEPs. The Liberal Democrats, who were in government in the UK with the Conservatives at the time, lost 10 of the 11 seats they were defending, and won just 7% of the popular vote.

Figures released in December 2014 showed that the Conservatives and UKIP each spent £2.96m on the campaign, the Liberal Democrats £1.5m, and the Labour Party approximately £1m.

Voting system and regional representation

The United Kingdom elected 73 Members of the European Parliament using proportional representation. The United Kingdom was divided into twelve multi-member constituencies. The eleven of these regions which form Great Britain used a closed-list party list system method of proportional representation, calculated using the D'Hondt method. Northern Ireland used the Single transferable vote (STV). As a result of the Treaty of Lisbon coming into force, the UK became entitled to a 73rd MEP as from November 2011. The Electoral Commission performed a reallocation in keeping with the same procedures it used to allocate 72 MEPs; an extra Conservative MEP was allocated to the West Midlands constituency, based on the 2009 vote, and was enshrined in the European Union Act 2011 as an amendment of the European Parliamentary Elections Act 2002.

1 Includes Gibraltar, the only British Overseas Territory which was part of the European Union.

Returning officers
The European Parliamentary Elections (Returning Officers) Order 2013 provides for the designated Returning officer for each electoral region to be the council official responsible for elections in each of the following Westminster constituencies: Kettering for the East Midlands, Chelmsford for the Eastern region, Lewisham, Deptford for the London region, Sunderland Central for the North East region, Manchester Central for the North West region, Falkirk for Scotland, Southampton, Test for the South East region, Poole for the South West region, Preseli Pembrokeshire for Wales, Birmingham Ladywood for the West Midlands region, Leeds Central for the Yorkshire and Humber region, and Belfast South for the Northern Ireland Region.

MEPs before the 2014 election, by European Parliament group
Between the 2009 and 2014 elections, there were various changes to the breakdown of UK members. In December 2011, a 73rd member from the UK (Anthea McIntyre, Conservative) was allocated to England because of the implementation of the Treaty of Lisbon. There were also various defections:
one Conservative MEP (Edward McMillan-Scott) defected to the Liberal Democrats (March 2010);
one Conservative MEP (Roger Helmer) defected to UKIP (March 2012);
two UKIP MEPs (David Campbell Bannerman in May 2011 and Marta Andreasen in February 2013) defected to the Conservatives;
one UKIP MEP (Nikki Sinclaire) left the party, and later founded the We Demand a Referendum party;
one UKIP MEP (Mike Nattrass) left the party in September 2013, and later founded An Independence from Europe;
one UKIP MEP (Godfrey Bloom) left the party in September 2013, and sat as an independent;
one BNP MEP (Andrew Brons) left the party, and later founded the British Democratic Party.

The Ulster Conservatives and Unionists - New Force (UCUNF) electoral pact between the Conservatives and the Ulster Unionist Party (UUP) was dissolved.

Thus, before the 2014 election, the following parties had MEPs representing UK constituencies:

Parties and candidates
39 parties stood a total of 747 candidates. The Conservative Party and UKIP had candidates in every region, as did the three Green parties. Labour, the Liberal Democrats and the BNP had a full slate of candidates in all the regions in Great Britain (i.e. excluding Northern Ireland). The English Democrats and An Independence from Europe had a full slate of candidates in all the English regions. No2EU had a full slate in seven regions, while Britain First and the Socialist Party of Great Britain had full slates in two regions each. The Harmony Party stood in four regions and the Christian Peoples Alliance in three regions. Other parties only stood in one region.

Retiring/resigned incumbents

British Democratic Party
(Elected in 2009 as British National Party)
Andrew Brons – Yorkshire and the Humber

Conservative
 Struan Stevenson (Scotland)
 Sir Robert Atkins (North West England)
 Giles Chichester (South West England and Gibraltar)
 Robert Sturdy (East of England)

Green
 Caroline Lucas (South East England) – Resigned 17 May 2010 & replaced by Keith Taylor

Labour
Michael Cashman (West Midlands)
Stephen Hughes (North East England)
Arlene McCarthy (North West England)
Brian Simpson (North West England)
Peter Skinner (South East England)

Liberal Democrats
 Diana Wallis (Yorkshire and the Humber) – Resigned 31 January 2012 & replaced by Rebecca Taylor
 Liz Lynne (West Midlands) – Resigned 4 February 2012 & replaced by Phil Bennion
 Sharon Bowles – (South East England)
 Rebecca Taylor (Yorkshire and the Humber)
 Fiona Hall (North East England)

UKIP
 John Bufton (Wales)
 Trevor Colman (South West England and Gibraltar)
 Derek Clark (East Midlands)
 Godfrey Bloom (Yorkshire & Humber), Having spent the last 8 months of his term as an independent

Debates
On 20 February, the Deputy Prime Minister Nick Clegg used his weekly phone-in show on LBC 97.3 to challenge the leader of the UK Independence Party, Nigel Farage, to a live public debate on the UK's membership of the European Union. Clegg said, "he is the leader of the party of 'out'; I am the leader of the party of 'in'. I think it's time we now have a proper, public debate so that the public can listen to the two sides of the argument and judge from themselves." Farage accepted, but said he would also like to see Ed Miliband and David Cameron participate.

The first hour-long debate between the two men was held on 26 March 2014 and was broadcast live on television by Sky News and on the BBC News Channel. The debate was hosted by LBC and moderated by Nick Ferrari. After the first debate, a YouGov poll asked "Who performed better?", with 57% saying Farage did better compared to 36% for Clegg.

The second debate was held on BBC Two on 2 April in a special programme called The European Union: In or Out, moderated by David Dimbleby. Farage was again seen as outperforming his rival, with a snap poll by YouGov showing 68% of people thought he did better in the debate compared to 27% for Clegg. A snap Guardian poll also showed that 69% thought Farage won the debate.

Despite David Cameron and Ed Miliband declining to participate in the leaders' debates, the Conservative and Labour parties were represented in a lower-profile debate on the BBC. On 13 February Andrew Neil hosted a four-way debate on the BBC's Sunday Politics programme. The Conservatives were represented by Syed Kamall MEP, Labour by Richard Howitt MEP, the Liberal Democrats by Baroness Sarah Ludford MEP and the UK Independence Party by Patrick O'Flynn, the party's Director of communications and an MEP candidate.

Opinion polls

Graphical summary

These opinion polls are for Great Britain and generally exclude Northern Ireland. The methodology used for these polls broadly corresponds to that used for opinion polling for the next United Kingdom general election; see that article for the methodology used by each polling company. YouGov have experimented with different methods of polling for these elections, using their own method for their 8–9 January 2013 poll and another corresponding to that used by Survation and ComRes for their 10–11 January 2013 poll (both below) and argue that their method gives more accurate answers. Data for these polls are generally gathered at the same time as the data for General Election polling.

2014

2013

Scottish polls

Welsh polls

London polls

Results

United Kingdom results

Election results by constituency

MEPs defeated

Conservative

Marina Yannakoudakis – London
Martin Callanan – North East
Marta Andreasen – South East

Liberal Democrats

Bill Newton Dunn – East Midlands
Andrew Duff – East of England
Sarah Ludford – London
Chris Davies – North West
Graham Watson – South West
Phil Bennion – West Midlands
Edward McMillan-Scott – Yorkshire and the Humber
George Lyon – Scotland

British National Party

Nick Griffin – North West

An Independence from Europe

Mike Nattrass – West Midlands

We Demand a Referendum

Nikki Sinclaire – West Midlands

Analysis

The UK Independence Party (UKIP) came top of the poll, the first time a political party other than the Labour Party or Conservative Party had won the popular vote at a British election since the 1906 general election. It was also the first time a party other than Labour or Conservative had won the largest number of seats in a national election since the December 1910 general election. However, by the end of 2018, following multiple departures and other changes, only 9 MEPs remained affiliated to UKIP. By February 2019, there were only 7 UKIP MEPs, while 7 former UKIP MEPs had joined the new Brexit Party.

The Labour Party became the first Official Opposition party since 1984 to fail to win a European Parliament election, although it did gain 7 seats, taking its overall tally to 20. It concurrently won the largest share of the vote in 100 council areas, with its largest vote share recorded in Newham at 58.4%.

The governing Conservative Party was pushed into third place for the first time at any European Parliament election, winning just 23.3% of the national vote share and losing 7 seats to fall to 19 overall, one behind Labour. It won the largest share of the vote in just 89 council areas and its highest vote was recorded in Elmbridge at 43.1%.

The Green Party of England and Wales saw its number of MEPs increase for the first time since 1999, winning a total of 3 seats. The party rose from fifth place to fourth, although its vote share declined slightly compared to 2009. This was the first time since 1989 that the Greens had outpolled the Liberal Democrats in a European election.

In Scotland, the Scottish National Party won the largest share of the vote taking 28.9% of the vote and retained its two of the six Scottish seats.

The Liberal Democrats, who were in coalition with the Conservatives at the time, lost ten of the eleven seats they were defending and won just 6.9% of the vote share nationally. Their highest vote share was recorded in Gibraltar, where they won a 67.2% share of the vote.

See also
Bloomberg speech
List of political parties in the United Kingdom
Opinion polling for the 2015 United Kingdom general election
2016 United Kingdom European Union membership referendum
2015 United Kingdom general election

Notes

References

External links
 UK European Parliament Information Office
 Euro Election 2014

Manifestos
 Alliance
 Conservative
 Democratic Unionist Party
 Green Party in Northern Ireland
 Labour
 Plaid Cymru
 Scottish Green Party
 Social Democratic and Labour Party
 Traditional Unionist Voice
 UK Independence Party

2014 elections in the United Kingdom
European Parliament elections in the United Kingdom
United Kingdom